Anarsia bipinnata is a moth in the family Gelechiidae. It was described by Edward Meyrick in 1932. It is found in the Russian Far East, Korea and Japan.

The larvae feed on Elaeagnus multiflora, Elaeagnus umbellata, Acer ginnala and Quercus species.

References

bipinnata
Moths described in 1932
Moths of Asia